Cyclotron Road is a fellowship program for technology innovators at Lawrence Berkeley National Laboratory, or Berkeley Lab. Cyclotron Road supports entrepreneurial scientists as they advance their own technology projects that have the promise of significant global impact. The core support for the program comes from the Department of Energy's Office of Energy Efficiency and Renewable Energy, through the Lab-Embedded Entrepreneurship Program. Most of the technologies developed by Cyclotron Road fellows are designed to accelerate the transition to a decarbonized economy.

Berkeley Lab manages the program in close partnership with Activate, a nonprofit organization established to scale the Cyclotron Road fellowship model to a greater number of innovators around the U.S. and the world. The Activate website describes this connection explicitly: "Activate’s entrepreneurial fellowship model originated at Cyclotron Road, a division of Lawrence Berkeley National Laboratory and founding Activate partner."  Activate Fellows have founded companies have raised more $1.3 billion in follow-on funding and created more than 1200 jobs. Most of those fellows participated in the Cyclotron Road program.

How Cyclotron Road operates

Eligibility
To be eligible for the program, a candidate must
have a bachelor’s degree and 4+ years of experience beyond that degree in scientific research, engineering, or technology development.
be the leader of a technical project or company in the physical or biological sciences, or related engineering disciplines and is relevant to the industries that Cyclotron Road focuses on.
be leading the commercial development of a hardware-based technology innovation for the first time. (Two co-applicants can apply together.)
not have raised more than $2,000,000 in debt or equity funding from non-governmental sources for the proposed project.
be able to work in the U.S. for the duration of the fellowship, and have access to a qualified host facility or research laboratory at Berkeley Lab.
In addition, the project or company must still be in development and not yet ready for full-scale product sales at the time of the application deadline.

Selection of fellows
Cyclotron Road chooses a new cohort of fellows in the Spring each year, and the selected candidates prepare to start their two-year fellowship. Activate Berkeley administers the fellowship application process for Cyclotron Road.  The Activate organization focuses their outreach effort on candidates from underrepresented backgrounds. Applications are due in the Fall, with an October deadline. The applications that pass an initial blinded selection process proceed to a technical review and video interviews. The top applicants are named finalists and deliver a virtual pitch to the Activate community. In March, Cyclotron Road and Activate work with sponsors to award the fellowships to successful applicants.

Support for fellows 
Cyclotron Road supports fellows in several ways during their two-year fellowship term as they develop their promising technology concepts into potential products. Fellows receive:
two years of living stipend, health insurance, a relocation stipend, and a travel allowance. 
$100,000 of research funding
access to scientific user facilities at Berkeley Lab
mentorship from experienced entrepreneurs
a curriculum designed for science-based startups
inclusion in an extensive network of advisors and a community of current and alumni fellows

Notable alumni and their companies 
The following table lists some notable alumni from the first four cohorts who are now in leadership positions, usually with the companies that they founded or co-founded.

References

Fellowships
Lawrence Berkeley National Laboratory
Entrepreneurship organizations
Entrepreneurship in the United States
Business incubators of the United States
 Renewable energy companies of the United States